This is a list of episodes of the South Korean variety show Running Man in 2022. The show airs on SBS as part of their Good Sunday lineup.


Episodes

Viewership

Notes

References

External links 
  

Lists of Running Man (TV series) episodes
Lists of variety television series episodes
Lists of South Korean television series episodes
2022 in South Korean television